Satow is a municipality in the Rostock district, in Mecklenburg-Vorpommern, Germany.

At 1 July 2003, the municipalities Bölkow, Hanstorf, Heiligenhagen, Radegast, Reinshagen (not to be confused with the Reinshagen of Lalendorf) and Satow of the former Amt Satow where merged to the amtsfreie (without Amt) Gemeinde Satow.

Municipal council 

The municipal council has 17 members. The elections held on 26 May 2019 yielded the following results:

References